Joanna King is an American politician and businesswoman serving as a member of the Indiana House of Representatives for the 49th district. She assumed office on December 21, 2020.

Education 
King graduated from Northridge High School in Middlebury, Indiana.

Career 
After graduating from high school, King started a pretzel business. She and her husband operate the King Corporation, which includes tourism and hospitality businesses. She was an unsuccessful candidate for the Indiana Senate in 2016. In 2020, she was appointed to the Indiana House of Representatives.

References 

Living people
People from Goshen, Indiana
People from Elkhart County, Indiana
Republican Party members of the Indiana House of Representatives
Women state legislators in Indiana
Businesspeople from Indiana
Year of birth missing (living people)